The women's discus throw at the 2012 World Junior Championships in Athletics was held at the Estadi Olímpic Lluís Companys on 13 and 15 July.

Medalists

Records
, the existing world junior and championship records were as follows.

Qualification
Qual. rule: qualification standard 53.00 m (Q) or at least best 12 qualified (q)

Final

Participation
According to an unofficial count, 35 athletes from 25 countries participated in the event.

References

External links
 WJC12 Discus throw schedule

Discus Throw W
Discus throw at the World Athletics U20 Championships
2012 in women's athletics